Ackermans is a retail store based in South Africa.

Ackermans may also refer to:

Stan Ackermans (1936–1995), Dutch mathematician
Ackermans & van Haaren, Belgian holding company

See also
Ackerman (disambiguation)
Ackermann (disambiguation)
Akkerman (disambiguation)
Akerman
Åkerman, a Swedish surname